Mansel Carter (May 12, 1902 – June 5, 1987), also known as "Man of the Mountain", was a businessman and prospector. In 1987, The Phoenix named him one of "Arizona Legends". The San Tan Historical Society of Queen Creek recognized his gravesite at Gold Mountain in the San Tan Mountain Regional Park in Queen Creek, Arizona as a tourist attraction. In 2017, the town of Queen Creek named a new community park the "Mansel Carter Oasis Park" in his honor.

Early years
Carter was born in Quaker City, Ohio. When he was young, he studied photography and worked as a mechanic in his hometown. He moved to Indiana and purchased an airplane with which he provided a shuttle service. During the Great Depression, he worked as a lumberjack on the Zuni Indian Reservation.

Marion E. Kennedy
In 1941, Carter moved to the town of Gilbert, Arizona, and opened a photography shop. He was drafted by the United States Army during World War II and served a short tour of duty. He was eventually discharged on account of his age. He met and befriended Marion E. Kennedy (1874–1960), a Cherokee Indian from Oklahoma whose job was delivering ice. Kennedy had at one time attended the Indian School in Carlisle, Pennsylvania, where he studied geology.

Gold prospecting

Carter received a monthly pension from the military. Both Carter and Kennedy decided to try their hands as gold prospectors and moved to the San Tan Mountains in the town of Queen Creek. The mountain men, as they became known, established various claims, and their campsite became their home. Kennedy taught Carter how to drill for gold, and they became life-long friends. When Kennedy died in 1960, Carter buried him near their campsite.

Carter discontinued prospecting for gold after the death of his friend. He handcarved and sold "cactus curios" to the many visitors from different parts of the country. Carter was featured in "Arizona Road" with Bill Leverton. He kept a guest book, which along with some of his cactus curios and many of his personal belongings, were donated to the San Tan Historical Society’s Museum after he died in 1987 of cancer. That same year The Phoenix named him an "Arizona Legend".

Both Carter and Kennedy are buried where their campsite was located near the Goldmine Trail. Their gravesite is considered a historical tourist attraction by the San Tan Historical Society of Queen Creek. The mountain in which they prospected is known as the Gold Mountain and the area is now part of the San Tan Mountain Regional Park system. In 2017, the town of Queen Creek named a new community park the "Mansel Carter Oasis Park".

Gallery

Further reading
 "Queen Creek"; by Sylvia G Acuna; Publisher: Arcadia Publishing Library Editions; 
 "Around San Tan Mountain (AZ)"; by David Salge; Publisher: Arcadia Publishing;

See also

 List of historic properties in Queen Creek, Arizona

Arizona pioneers
 Bill Downing
 Henry Garfias
 Winston C. Hackett
 John C. Lincoln
 Paul W. Litchfield
 Joe Mayer
 William John Murphy
 Wing F. Ong
 Levi Ruggles
 Sedona Schnebly
 Michael Sullivan
 Trinidad Swilling
 Ora Rush Weed
 Henry Wickenburg

References

1902 births
1987 deaths
People from Gilbert, Arizona
People from Guernsey County, Ohio
Businesspeople from Arizona
Mountain men
People from Queen Creek, Arizona
20th-century American businesspeople
American military personnel of World War II